Pawanexh Kohli is the founding Chief Executive of India's National Centre for Cold-chain Development (NCCD), the premier think-tank in agri-logistics set up in public-private-partnership mode in 2012, and from 2012 to 2020 was the Chief Advisor to Ministry of Agriculture & Farmers Welfare.

Early life
Born to an Indian Air Force officer, he accompanied his parents with their postings at various Indian cities. As a consequence, his education was cross cultural and spread across various regions in India and the schools he studied in include Frank Anthony School in Agra, Bishops School in Pune, Jesus and Mary School in Amritsar before completing his high schooling from The Air Force School in New Delhi. He subsequently completed his professional education from LBS College of Advanced Maritime Studies and Research as a certified Master Mariner, having earlier completed his professional training at the TS Rajendra.

Career
In 1982, Kohli commenced his career as a mariner and was later master of oceangoing ships for the final 15 years. Amongst others, he was the master and captain of one of the world's largest refrigerated cross-ocean carriers (reefer ships). Besides refrigerated transportation, he also directed or operated car carriers, oil tankers, container ships, ice-class general cargocarriers, timber carriers and others.

Between 2008 and 2012 Capt. Kohli contributed through professional executive roles as the prime mover in one of the largest logistics and distribution companies in India and later for the integration of the largest logistics & supply chain infrastructure enterprises, heading the development of solutions to drive a pan-national footprint of India's first set of Free Trade Zones.

In 2012 he was selected by the Government of India to help incubate the National Centre for Cold-chain Development (NCCD) as its Chief Advisor. Shortly thereafter, the body was restructured and in 2014, he was selected as its founding Chief Executive Officer. He was then also accorded  entitlements equivalent to those of Joint Secretary in Government of India. Concurrently, he continued to serve as the Chief Advisor to the Agriculture Ministry to guide initiatives related to post harvest management and agricultural supply chain.

At NCCD, Kohli had key involvement in establishing a historic MoU of cooperation in cold chain between nodal Indian and French organisations. He was guest of honor and represented India at the International Conference on Sustainable Cold Chain in Paris (April 2013). In July 2015 he was invited as a global expert to speak on the Global Food Crisis at the House of Lords in UK.

Kohli is a member councilor of various national committees and advisor to industry organisations and is chairman of the national Committee on Supply chain and Logistics, the first such committee set up with a focus on the supply chain by the government. He also co-chairs the committees on Human Resource Development and Research & Development for cold chain. He is a principal member of the Indian government's Committee for Doubling Farmers' Income, set up in 2016 and has authored & co-authored a number of policy documents. Role as a thought leader is also acknowledged in various other Task Forces and Committees on agricultural marketing and logistics.

In 2018, the University of Birmingham conferred Kohli the title of Honorary Professor. After leading NCCD for eight years, on 31 January 2020, Kohli resigned from the position of CEO of NCCD and as Chief Advisor to Department of Agriculture & Farmers Welfare of India.

Honors and awards
In December 2010 he was acknowledged in his individual capacity, as the "Cold Chain Personality of the Year" by an expert panel hosted by KPMG-Supply Chain Leadership Council. The award was in appreciation for individual contributions to the industry and for aligning focus on the socio-economic fabric in India.

In 2012 he was applauded with the "Exemplary Thought Leadership Award" by the ICE Centre of Excellence in India. In 2014 he won the prestigious Agribusiness Leadership Award at the annual Agriculture Leadership Summit in New Delhi. In 2016, ISHRAE lauded him as honorary lifetime member, their first ever. He is expert member of the Empowered Committee in the Ministry of New & Renewable Energy for implementation of Montreal Protocol and on the Global Advisory Committee of the International Solar Alliance (ISA)

In India, he is recognised as one among the few eminent persons from the private sector who have shifted over to public service by taking on specialist advisory roles in government organisations. He is recipient of various recognition and achievement awards from the cold chain industry in India.

References

External links
 Cold Chain Can Empower Producers
 Faster movement of refrigerated vans on anvil (Business Standard News Article)
 Cold Chain in India, Asian Food Regulation Information Service
 CII Institute of logistics (Article on Cold chain)
 India perishables supply chain "failing" (October 2012 at Cool Logistics Global)
 'RVC to help in removing bottlenecks to curb perishable goods prices'
 Newswire Release
 NCCD (India) and Cemafroid (France) sign MOU for Cold-chain Development
 Energy Centre - RGREP of HAREDA
 Supply gap high in refrigerated vans, pack houses: NCCD
 Government launches toll free number for perishable food transporters
 Nabard, NCCD to streamline cold chain infra development
 Effective Cold chains help Productivity
 Refrigerated transport: Balyan for farm-to-fork connectivity
 The Middle Class Are Urbanizing at a Rapid Speed, Can the Global Food System Keep Up?
 In Future, Development Focus Needs to be More on Modern Pack-Houses and Refrigerated Transport
 NCCD report highlights missing links in agri-logistics
 Community Cooling Concept by Pawanexh Kohli
 Post-COVID 19: Don’t go back to old ways, says ex-CEO NCCD
 Coronavirus pandemic | Countries must prepare sustainable logistics to deliver COVID-19 vaccine
 Prepare now to sustainably deliver the Covid-19 vaccine

1963 births
Living people
People in agriculture
Indian business theorists
Development specialists
Sea captains
Scholars from Ludhiana
20th-century Indian economists
Indian agricultural economists